Cactus modulaire is a 1986 outdoor bronze sculpture by , installed in Montreal, Quebec, Canada. It is situated next to the La Laurentienne Building in Downtown Montreal. The sculpture weighs  and is composed of a bronze and beryllium alloy, cast in the Lafeuille foundry in Nogent-sur-Oise, France.

See also

 1986 in art

References

External links
 

1986 establishments in Canada
1986 sculptures
Bronze sculptures in Canada
Downtown Montreal
Outdoor sculptures in Montreal